Chlamydophytum is a genus of flowering plants belonging to the family Balanophoraceae.

Its native range is Western Central Tropical Africa.

Species:
 Chlamydophytum aphyllum Mildbr.

References

Balanophoraceae
Santalales genera